Herbert George Shoener (January 2, 1923 – December 1985) was an American football end in the National Football League for the Washington Redskins.  He played college football at the University of Iowa and Lehigh University and was drafted in the 31st round of the 1947 NFL Draft.

1923 births
1985 deaths
People from Reedsville, West Virginia
American football wide receivers
Iowa Hawkeyes football players
Lehigh Mountain Hawks football players
Washington Redskins players
Twin sportspeople